(stylized in block capitals) is a free-to-play mobile action game co-developed by WFS, inc. and Key. It was released on February 10, 2022 for iOS and Android in Japan. It is Jun Maeda's first completely new game in 15 years as main scenario writer since Little Busters! (2007). A version for Windows is available on Steam.

Gameplay
The player takes the point of view of Ruka Kayamori, a former vocalist and guitarist for now-disbanded legendary band "She is Legend". The game has a day-to-day system in which the player starts as newly enrolled Ruka Kayamori, meeting new characters as the story progresses. Monthly events take place within the game in the form of side stories, told from other characters' perspectives.

Heaven Burns Red is a turn-based role playing game in which the player can assemble a team of 6 out of 48 available girls and fight against extraterrestrial beings known as Cancer. During their turn, the player can choose 3 characters from the party to perform an action (attack, heal, etc). Both characters and Cancer are equipped with Deflectors (DF) which work as a shield and can also be healed; characters HP cannot be healed if their DF breaks and will be left vulnerable, though some characters have the skill to heal a broken DF. The game's story is told in a visual novel style, fully voiced. There is also a "Sixth Sense Mode".

Plot
Heaven Burns Red takes place in a world where the Earth is being attacked by mysterious extraterrestrial life forms called "Cancer." Cancer are immune to any kind of weapon and have been forcing humanity to abandon most of the Earth's surface. Left with little time before they face extinction, humanity successfully created a weapon to take on Cancer known as "Seraph." Humanity gathered those who had mastered the art of manipulating Seraphs and established "Seraph Corps" as their last hope. Those who could manipulate Seraphs have one thing in common: they are all girls. One of them is Ruka Kayamori, who finds herself thrown into the war against Cancer.

Characters

Unit 31A
"Beat Down, Rise Up. War does not determine who is right. Only who is left."

 Seraphim code: "My legend starts now."
 This game's protagonist. She serves as the commanding officer of 31A. The former guitarist and vocalist for the legendary rock band "She is Legend". She loves music and forms a new "She is Legend" with the other 5 in 31A. She is carefree and cares deeply about her friends, but she will sometimes stand her ground. She serves as the guitarist and one of two vocalists for the new "She is Legend". She has a habit of giving nicknames to people she forms a bond with.

 
 Seraphim code: "Hello world." / Nickname by Ruka: "Yukki"
A genius hacker from the hacker group named "Orchid", whom was responsible for preventing World War III. She is the only person with common sense within 31A, often having to serve as the straight man towards the antics her fellow members get into. She is a fan of the rock band "She is Legend" which Kayamori was a member of. Ever since joining the Seraph Corps, she finds herself being dragged around by everyone's antics. However, she supports Kayamori nevertheless. She is the drummer of the newly formed "She is Legend".

 
 Seraphim code: "The savior has arrived." / Nickname by Ruka: "Megumin"
A spirited psychic from Kansai. She can use a variety of psychic powers, but the strength of her powers is unknown. Or rather, she has not been very useful since joining the Seraph Corps. However she believes that she will be the one to save the world. Since Kayamori is considered the genius of their generation, she feels a one sided rivalry towards her. She is one of the guitarists for the newly formed "She is Legend".

 
 Seraphim code: "There's more than just one truth." / Nickname by Ruka: "Tsukasacchi"
 A self proclaimed elite intelligence officer with unparalleled beauty. However, no matter how you look at it, she is just an unreliable intelligence officer only capable of giving useless information. She enjoys giving tips to her fellow 31A members. She is the keyboardist of the newly formed "She is Legend".

 
 Seraphim code: "Let's kill as if it were mere breathing." / Nickname by Ruka: "Karerin" and "Karenchan"
A gamer who specializes in FPS games. Her personality is as cute as she looks. She enjoys junk food and can eat with one had so she can keep playing games. She has a second personality of that of a terrifying murderer. She serves as one of two vocalists of the newly formed "She is Legend".

 
 Seraphim code: "The best under all of heaven." / Nickname by Ruka: "Otama-san"
 Despite her short and cute appearance, she is a former captain of a battleship. She lost a battle in the Sea of Okhotsk and resigned. She is naturally an airhead but she is not aware of it. She adores her fellow 31A member, Megumi Aikawa, for always standing up for her. She serves as the bassist for the newly formed "She is Legend".

31B
"Love and peace. Death is not the end of life. but the completion of life."

 Seraphim code: "Please have some tranquil memories." / Nickname by Ruka: "Aoi"
 The commanding officer of 31B. She lacks confidence and is always timid. She has Hyperthymesia which allows her to remember everything she has ever seen or experienced. She often spaces out. She joins the newly formed "She is legend" and takes over as the rhythm guitarist for chapter 2.

 
 Seraphim code: "Burn within the inferno." / Nickname by Ruka: "Ichigo"
 Sumomo's older sister, a former hit man. Her favorite sport is baseball.

 
 Seraphim code: "Freeze within Niflheim." / Nickname by Ruka: "Sumomo"
The younger of the Minase siblings. Also an ex hitman.

 
 Seraphim code: "Show me some fresh 'death'." / Nickname by Ruka: "Higumin"
 A researcher of seraphs. A genies scientist. She is curious about "death" thus she enrolled herself into the seraph corps.

 
 Seraphim code: "Sleep, innocent requiem." / Nickname by Ruka: "Kojyu"
 A girl that can see ghosts. Her left eye holds a special power to send ghosts to afterlife and is a different color, she hides it behind an eyepatch.

 Seraphim code: growls / Nickname by Ruka: "Byakko"
 A white tiger. She is rather smart and understand human speech. She is shy so she was only close to Erika at the beginning.

31C
"Failure is not an option. All's wright with the world."

 Seraphim code: "This world is my labratory." / Nickname by Ruka: "Wakki"
 The comanding officer of 31C. A self proclaimed mad scientist who is plotting for world domination with Bungo. She challenges Ruka for the unit name 31A in chapter 1 due to "A" being seen as the elite of their generation.

 
 Seraphim code: "May the stars guide you." / Nickname by Ruka: "Saku-chan"
 A fortune teller. She can't tell fortunes without her crystal ball. Her fortune telling accuracy is 53%.

 
 Seraphim code: "Oblivion is death, live in remembrance." / Nickname by Ruka: "Tennen-chan"
 Self proclaimed "extraordinary magician". Her potions have cured diseases and is a great benifit to the world at large.

 
 Seraphim code: "Let's begin the world domination-gesu! / Nickname by Ruka: "Bun-chan"
 Self proclaimed Yamawaki's familiar. Her mental age is quite young. Suffers from anterograde amnesia so she doesn't remember anything after she sleeps.

 
 Seraphim code: "It's ninja showtime!" / Nickname by Ruka: "Aa-san"
 An attention-seeking ninja. She admired ninjas at a young age and trained themselves to master ninjutsu. 

 
 Seraphim code: "One order of annihilation coming up!" / Nickname by Ruka: "Marii"
 She runs all the shops at the base. Has a large number of male siblings so she behaves violently sometimes.

30G
"Faith. Keep your eyes on the stars, but your feet on the ground." 
A senior seraph unit.

 Seraphim code: "Noblesse oblige" / Nickname by Ruka: "Yuina-senpai"
Commanding officer of 30G. She is serious and sincere but also easily approachable. Has a cute side that gets flustered easily.

 
 Seraphim code: "Fūrinkazan" / Nickname by Ruka: "Monanyan"
 The strongest within the seraph corps. Had a dream of opening a cafe with a former unit member.

 
 Seraphim code: "Resound, strings of exorcism!" / Nickname by Ruka: "Myaa-san"
 A talented archer. She loves Japanese culture and strives to preserve it.

 
 Seraphim code: "Cuteness is the best." / Nickname by Ruka: "Sugayan"
 A girl who loves lolita clothes.

 
 Seraphim code: "Approach and I'll cut you!" / Nickname by Ruka: "Hisamecchi"
 A genius swordswomen. Her seraph weapon is a gun. She has a self imposed setting which states that she can't fight for more than 3 minutes. 

 
 Seraphim code: "A huge arvent, time to reap!" / Nickname by Ruka: "Kuracchi"
 She loves rice. She and Tsukishiro is a duo that is known to be the strongest duo in the seraph corps.

31D
"Fly high! Try to be a rainbow in someone's cloud."

 Seraphim code: "I'll be taking the Tengen." / Nickname by Ruka: "Misarin"
 Commanding officer of 31D. She is the youngest professional Go player to have 50 consecutive wins.

 
 Seraphim code: "I'll dye the world with my colors." / Nickname by Ruka: "Irocchi"
 An artist that creates unique works of art. She has color-blindness so her perception of colors is different from that of ordinary people, she doesn't see this as a setback for her artistic career.

 
 Seraphim code: "Make a change...Kill yourself." / Nickname by Ruka: "Fubukin"
 A girl who loves depressive black metal. She and Ruka seem to be operating on the same wavelength because they both love music.

 
 Seraphim code: "Always look up!" / Nickname by Ruka: "Risa-mama"
 An elite volleyball player. She has an overwelimg motherly aura.

 
 Seraphim code: "Don't be targeted for an ace." / Nickname by Ruka: "Akarin"
 An elite tennis player with a negative temperament. During practice she does well but during tournaments she can't seem to display her real talents so her record is zero.

 
 Seraphim code: "You can dive anywhere." / Nickname by Ruka: "Aichin"
 She has a doctorate in Marine biology.

31E
"Get it together! Tomorrow's just another day."

A serph unit consisting of the Ooshima sextuplets. Their family is poor so they enrolled together for the benifits of being in the seraph corps.

 Seraphim code: "The eldest daughter of the Ooshima household is here." / Nickname by Ruka: "Icchii"
 Comanding officer of 31E. She is the eldest daughter of the Ooshima family. She love to study and wants to be a member of the military. She loves her sisters very much.

 
 Seraphim code: "That's enough vanity."  / Nickname by Ruka: "Niina"
 The second eldest of the Ooshima family. She has confidence in her own appearance. She worked as a model and would give the cloths she got to her siblings.

 
 Seraphim code: "Alright, your firepower has been deliverd." / Nickname by Ruka: "Minorin"
 Third eldest of the Ooshima family. She worked for a newspaper and delivery company to support her family. She also helps out the serpah headquarters by delivering various packages on her skaeboard.

 
 Seraphim code: "Let's work harder...not!" / Nickname by Ruka: "Yottsun"
 Fourth daughter of the Ooshima family. She likes to sleep.

 
 Seraphim code: "Open the lock." / Nickname by Ruka: "Isuzucchi"
 Fifth daughter of the Ooshima family. She's good at picking locks. She says that she's "good at handling girls" apperently. Since she is good with her hands, she's very good at giving massages and the person reciving the message gives out all kinds of information without realizing it. 

 
 Seraphim code: "I won't fall." / Nickname by Ruka: "Muua"
 The youngest of the Ooshima family. She's friendly and able to make friends with a lot of people. She seems to enjoy having physical pain inflicted upon her.

31F
"We live better. Courage is like love; it must have hope for nourishment."

 Seraphim code: "As requested by the young lady." / Nickname by Ruka: "Yanagin"
 The commanding officer of 31F. She is a butler who serves Kanata. She is skilled in all kinds of jobs including housework, chorse, and combat. She is a little overprotective of Kanata and can be quite ruthless if Kanata is involved.

 
 Seraphim code: "I'll show you the diffrence in our tastes." / Nickname by Ruka: "Maru-chan"
 The only daughter of a prestigious family who is a tomboy. She relies on Mion a lot but refuses to admit it.

 
 Seraphim code: "This is my stage." / Nickname by Ruka: "Shikkii"
 A conductor of classical music. She belives that in order to create good music one must be intouch with your emotions, and in order to be in touch with your emotions, you must experiance a lot of love affairs. She invites a lot of girls to her room. Her dream is to create an orchestra that is centered around her(a harem). She holds Ruka in high regard as they are both musicians.

 
 Seraphim code: "No matter the battlefield, just leave it to me." / Nickname by Ruka: "Matsuchiro"
 A stunt woman. Will cooperate with anything if asked.

 
 Seraphim code: "A flash of succession, now." / Nickname by Ruka: "Inorin"
 She is an inheritor of a sword style that is known for executing criminals from the Edo period. She gives off an aloof personality but in reality she is just bad at talking.

 
 Seraphim code: "I'll leave my back to you." / Nickname by Ruka: "Makkii"
 She is the leader of bike gang that took over the country in just one year.

31X
"Excelsior! Unglücklich das Land, das Helden Nötig hat."

A seraph unit consisting international exchange officers.

 Seraphim code: "Ready, steady, die." / Nickname by Ruka: "Carol"
 The commanding officer of 31A. She is a seraph member from the New York branch from the United States.

 
 Seraphim code: "Behold my hegemony." / Nickname by Ruka: "Yunyun"
 A seraph member from the Beijin branch in China.

 
 Seraphim code: "There is only one truth." / Nickname by Ruka: "Irene"
 A seraph member from the London branch in England. She is a detective.

 
 Seraphim code: "Numbers are the source of all things." / Nickname by Ruka: "Vri-chan"
 She is a serph member from the New Delhi branch in India. She is the youngest person ever to win a gold medal at the mathematical Olympiad.

 
 Seraphim code: "It's time for the lambs to confess." / Nickname by Ruka: "Maririn"
 A seraph member from the Rome branch in Italy.  She wears nun cloths.

 
 Seraphim code: "Love Charo." / Nickname by Ruka: "Charo"
 A seraph member from the Moscow branch in Russia. She alone has survived many terrifying battles. Due to such experiances she thinks of herself as a sort of binger of death and is reluctent to get close to others. Due to interactions with Ruka she opens up but becomes rather attached to Ruka. She gets jealous if Ruka ever gets closer to someone other than herself.

Headquarters

 
 Seraphim code: "Summer grass and soldiers are traces of dreams." / Nickname by Ruka: "Zukacchan"

 
 Nickname by Ruka: "Nanamin"

 
 Nickname by Ruka: "Asamin"

Development
In October 2019, it was announced that Jun Maeda was collaborating with Wright Flyer Studios and Key on Heaven Burns Red. Initially planned to be released in 2020, the game had been delayed to 2021, and subsequently to February 2022. Yuugen served as main visual illustrator and character designer, alongside Na-Ga, Fumuyun, and Maroyaka. Maeda also serves as composer. Nagi Yanagi performed the main theme and insert songs, while Rionos performed the ending theme.

Release
Heaven Burns Red released on February 10, 2022 for iOS and Android devices.

Notes

References

External links
  

2022 video games
Action role-playing video games
Key (company) games
Single-player video games
Video games developed in Japan